Dongyue may refer to:

Dongyue, Henan, a town in Xi County, Henan, China
Dongyue, Hongya County, a town in Hongya County, Sichuan, China
Dongyue Township, Shehong County, a township in Shehong County, Sichuan, China
Dongyue Township, Guang'an, a township in Guang'an, Sichuan, China
Dongyue Township, Dazhou, a township in Dazhou, Sichuan, China
Dongyue Subdistrict, a subdistrict in Longwen District, Zhangzhou, Fujian, China

See also
Dongyue Temple (disambiguation)
Dongyue Emperor
Mount Tai, a mountain in Shandong, China, traditionally known as Dongyue